The 2012 Superstars Series Vallelunga round was the seventh round of the 2012 Superstars Series season. It took place on 7 October at the ACI Vallelunga Circuit.

Johan Kristoffersson won both races, driving an Audi RS5.

Classification

Qualifying

Race 1

Race 2

Notes:
  – Giancarlo Fisichella was given a 25-second penalty for causing a collision with Camilo Zurcher.
  – Paolo Meloni was given a 25-second penalty for causing a collision with Francesco Sini.

Standings after the event

International Series standings

Italian Championship standings

Teams' Championship standings

 Note: Only the top five positions are included for both sets of drivers' standings.

References

2012 in Italian motorsport
Superstars Series seasons